Calum O'Connell (born 2 May 1990 in Perth, Western Australia) is an Australian footballer who plays for Kingsway.

Club career
O'Connell was a contestant on the First Season of the 2008 FOX8 television series Football Superstar. He made it to the top 10 of the competition, but lost out to eventual winner Adam Hett who won a youth contract with Sydney FC.

On 20 September 2009 he made his professional senior debut in a 4–2 loss against Perth Glory.

Business 
O'Connell in his spare time has built his own Activewear label called "Fearless Activewear" which started in 2015.

References

External links
 Brisbane Roar profile

1990 births
Living people
Australian soccer players
A-League Men players
Soccer players from Perth, Western Australia
Brisbane Roar FC players
Sydney United 58 FC players
National Premier Leagues players
Association football defenders